Vinoth Kishan is an Indian actor who has appeared in Tamil, Telugu and Malayalam language films. He made his debut as a child artiste in Bala's Nandha (2001), before playing villain in Naan Mahaan Alla (2010) and Vidiyum Munn (2013).

Career
Vinoth Kishan made his debut as a child artiste in Bala's Nandha (2001) portraying the younger version of Suriya's character before appearing in similar roles in Samasthanam (2002) and then Sena (2003). He also played a supporting role in A. L. Vijay's Kireedam (2007), portraying the younger brother of Ajith Kumar.

Kishan made a breakthrough portraying a villainous role in Suseenthiran's Naan Mahaan Alla (2010), where he played a ruthless college student who turns murderer, winning rave reviews for his portrayal. To prepare for the role, he trained in stunts for three months under fight choreographer Mahendran and then shot for the film for forty days. After being impressed with his role in the film, director Balaji roped in to play antihero in Vidiyum Munn (2013). For his role, he prepared extensively by practising the art of not blinking, as his character demanded such an approach and won positive reviews from critics for his portrayal.

His upcoming Tamil films are Papparapaam in which he portrays a man who comes to life at his funeral. and Andhaghaaram in which he plays a blind man.

Filmography 

All films are in Tamil, unless otherwise noted.

Other Projects 

All projects are in Tamil, unless otherwise noted.

References

Indian male film actors
Male actors in Tamil cinema
Living people
Indian male child actors
1989 births